Heidi Caroline Feek (born October 3, 1986) is an Americana singer and songwriter from Nashville, Tennessee.

Early life
Feek is the daughter of Rory Feek of country music duo Joey + Rory. She moved around growing up as her father was in the Marine Corps. Her family moved from Dallas, TX when she was in the third grade to Nashville, TN and her father bought a farm in Columbia, TN, where she grew up with her sister and father.

Music career 

Feek started her professional music career singing back-up for country duo Joey + Rory, in 2010. After releasing two solo EP's, she joined "firekid" (Dillon Hodges) in 2015 for his North American tour for his self-titled, debut album, firekid. She continued to perform with Hodges in 2016, providing electronic accompaniment to his singing.

Feek released her first EP, Eden, in 2010. Her music and vocals have been compared to Patsy Cline, Chris Isaak, and Neko Case.
Her debut, full-length album, The Only, was released on October 8, 2013 via Western Pin-Up Records.American Songwriter premiered the music video for her first single, "Someday Somebody" on September 18, 2013. The video stars Caitlin Rose and Sam Farkas (Space Capone).

In 2014, Feek released a video for her single, "Trail Pop". In 2015, Feek's recording of "Heartbreak Hotel" was used in the soundtrack of trailers for the film American Horror Story.

In 2016 Feek's father Rory released an album, Hymns That Are Important to Us, on which she sings harmony.

Film and television 
In 2016 Feek was music supervisor for the film Josephine, created by Rory Feek and based on the notes of a Civil War soldier.

Discography

Albums

Music videos

References

External links 

American alternative country singers
People from Nashville, Tennessee
1986 births
Living people
21st-century American singers
Country musicians from Tennessee